Hellinsia calais is a moth of the family Pterophoridae. It is found in Brazil and Costa Rica.

The wingspan is 21 mm. The forewings are pale fuscous irregularly irrorated with blackish. The hindwings are grey. Adults are on wing in October.

References

Moths described in 1930
calais
Moths of Central America
Moths of South America